Château de Lanquais is a château in Lanquais, Dordogne, Nouvelle-Aquitaine, France.

Châteaux in Dordogne
Monuments historiques of Dordogne